Martin Luther High School is a private Lutheran high school located in Greendale, Wisconsin, United States. The school is affiliated with the Lutheran Church–Missouri Synod.

History
Martin Luther High School was built after World War II as the second school of the Lutheran High School Association of Greater Milwaukee. It was designed to serve over 800 students. The campus has a drug- and smoke-free policy.

Overview
Member of Lutheran Church–Missouri Synod
Located across from Southridge Mall on 76th Street in Greendale, Wisconsin
Team name: Spartans
School colors: green, white and gold

Academics
The school has a college preparatory program that focuses on mathematics, literature, history, the arts and foreign language.

Extra-curricular activities
The school has three bands, the Spartan, the Varsity and the Symphonic Band. Symphonic Band is an audition-only band that has toured in Colorado, Texas, Tennessee, Florida and Washington D.C. Small ensembles include Jazz Band, Brass Choir, Flute Choir, Clarinet Choir, Woodwind Ensemble, Sax Choir and Pep Band.

There is a choir program comprising four choirs, including a men's and women's choir and two mixed choirs. The top choir, the Concert Choir, has toured in New York, California and Washington D.C. and has performed at choir competitions throughout the area. Students participate in the District Wisconsin State Music Association Contest in the spring.

Music classes cover the study of humanities, advanced music and independent study music theory. The music computer laboratory allows students to write music and familiarize themselves with music technology such as ACID, Reason and Sibelius music notation software.

Notable alumni 
 Jason Johnson - actor
 Candice Michelle - model/actress

References

External links
 Martin Luther High School
 Lutheran Church Missouri Synod
 Martin Luther High School Band

Private high schools in Wisconsin
Schools in Milwaukee County, Wisconsin
Lutheran schools in Wisconsin
Preparatory schools in Wisconsin
Secondary schools affiliated with the Lutheran Church–Missouri Synod